SJH may refer to:
 Safdarjung Hospital, in New Delhi, India
 Sahja railway station, in Rahim Yar Khan district, Punjab, Pakistan
 St. James's Hospital
 St. John's Hospital (disambiguation)
 St. Joseph's Hospital (disambiguation)